The Madison County Sheriff's Department provides the primary law enforcement service for approximately  of Madison County, Mississippi.  The Sheriff's Department has jurisdiction county wide; however, the municipalities of Canton, Flora, Madison and Ridgeland have concurrent jurisdiction within their respective city limits. The patrol division provides 24-hour law enforcement services to the county.

Authority
Mississippi state law, through the Law Enforcement Board of Minimum Standards, governs the minimum level of training for certified law enforcement officers. Before assuming a sworn position, each officer must be state-certified by a certified law enforcement academy.

Controversy
The department was subject to a class-action lawsuit filed by the American Civil Liberties Union alleging practices of excessive force, racial profiling, and unconstitutional practices including forcing confessions. The ALCU alleged that blacks are 5 times more likely to be stopped and arrested than whites in the county, despite having a similar population. Sheriff Tucker reportedly denied these allegations, but , the lawsuit is ongoing in U.S. District Court in Jackson, Mississippi.

References

Madison County, Mississippi
Sheriffs' departments of Mississippi